This is a list of the largest Sites of Special Scientific Interest in England in decreasing order of size. A lower threshold of 100 hectares or one square kilometre has been used.

Sites more than 10,000 hectares in size

Sites more than 4000 hectares in size

Sites more than 2000 hectares in size

Sites more than 1500 hectares in size

Sites more than 1000 hectares in size

Sites more than 750 hectares in size

Sites more than 500 hectares in size

Sites more than 400 hectares in size

Sites more than 300 hectares in size

Sites more than 250 hectares in size

Sites more than 200 hectares in size

Sites more than 150 hectares in size

Sites more than 100 hectares in size

Notes 
Data rounded to one decimal place.
Link to maps using the Nature on the Map service provided by English Nature.

 
Sites of Special Scientific Interest